Tropicis is a genus of beetles in the family Ciidae, containing the following species:

 Tropicis brevicarinatus Scott, 1926
 Tropicis flexicarinatus Scott, 1926
 Tropicis sexcarinatus (Waterhouse, 1876)

References

Ciidae genera